Piekiełko  is part of the town in Mława in Masovian Voivodeship, east-central Poland. Until 2004 it was a village in the administrative district of Gmina Iłowo-Osada, within Działdowo County, Warmian-Masurian Voivodeship.

Neighbourhoods in Poland
Mława County